Qian Zhidao (November 3, 1910 – September 28, 1989) was a Chinese chemist. He was a member of the Chinese Academy of Sciences.

References 

1910 births
1989 deaths
Members of the Chinese Academy of Sciences